Anthony Guy Amsterdam (born September 12, 1935) is an American lawyer and University Professor Emeritus at New York University School of Law. In 1981, Alan Dershowitz called Amsterdam “the most distinguished law professor in the United States.”

Education 
Amsterdam grew up in a middle-class neighborhood in West Philadelphia.

He received his A.B., summa cum laude in French Literature from Haverford College in 1957.  He received his LL.B., summa cum laude from the University of Pennsylvania School of Law in 1960.  While at Pennsylvania he served as Editor-in-Chief of the University of Pennsylvania Law Review.

Career 
Following law school, Amsterdam was law clerk to Justice Felix Frankfurter.  He then served as Assistant US Attorney in the District of Columbia.

In 1962, Amsterdam began teaching at the University of Pennsylvania.  He then taught at Stanford Law School from 1969 to 1981.  In 1981, he was hired by New York University School of Law after a "heated contest" among top law schools for his service.  He was the Judge Edward Weinfeld Professor of Law at NYU.

Working with the NAACP Legal Defense and Educational Fund, Amsterdam argued and won Furman v. Georgia in 1972, in which the Supreme Court of the United States ruled on the requirement for a degree of consistency in the application of the death penalty. He sits on the board of directors of the Death Penalty Information Center.

Amsterdam wrote Perspectives on the Fourth Amendment, an influential paper which has been called "one of the best, if not the best, law review article[s] written on the Fourth Amendment."  He was elected a Fellow of the American Academy of Arts and Sciences in 1977.

See also 
 List of law clerks of the Supreme Court of the United States (Seat 2)

References

External links 

 Profile at New York University School of Law

1935 births
Central High School (Philadelphia) alumni
Living people
Haverford College alumni
University of Pennsylvania Law School alumni
American anti–death penalty activists
Law clerks of the Supreme Court of the United States
MacArthur Fellows
Fellows of the American Academy of Arts and Sciences
New York University School of Law faculty
Lawyers from Philadelphia
20th-century American lawyers
21st-century American lawyers